Matching Head and Feet is a studio album by musician Kevin Coyne, released in 1975 on the Virgin label.

Awarding the album a B+, Robert Christgau wrote:
Coyne is the kind of minor artist whose faults-mainly an undeniable narrowness of emotional range that forces him to repeat effects-I am willing to overlook in this homogenized time. Sounding like a sly, bony, and clinically loony Joe Cocker (or a failed Deke Leonard), he here abandons quirky singer-songwriting for unkempt rock and roll."

Reviewing the album for AllMusic, Richie Unterberger said:
The arrangements are more conventional than most of his previous work (a pre-Police Andy Summers handles guitar), and much of the results are routine. Not lifeless, though; anything sung by Coyne will have roughness around the edges (and his voice here sometimes sounds not just raw, but downright worn). And songs about folks who carry guns, knives, and smash the faces of their wives (in "Turpentine") are not your usual rock fare. The words are unconventional, but the settings are average in a mid-'70s way, which dilutes the lyrics' impact, and makes this an unmemorable effort on the whole.

Track listing
All songs written by Kevin Coyne except where noted.
Side 1
 "Saviour" (Kevin Coyne, Archie Legget, Gordon Smith) – 5:31
 "Lucy" (Coyne, Legget) – 3:02
 "Lonely Lovers" – 4:19
 "Sunday Morning Sunrise" – 5:33
 "Rock 'n' Roll Hymn" (Coyne, Legget, Tim Penn) – 3:36
Side 2
"Mrs. Hooley Go Home" – 6:04
 "It's Not Me" – 3:40
 "Turpentine" – 3:32
 "Tulip" (Coyne, Andy Summers) – 6:36
 "One Fine Day" – 4:15

Personnel

Musicians

 Kevin Coyne – vocals
 Gordon Smith – semi-acoustic, electric and slide guitars
 Andy Summers – electric guitars
 Tim Penn – keyboards
 Archie Legget – bass
 Peter Woolf – drums and percussion
 Chris Mercer – tenor saxophone
 Bud Beadle – baritone saxophone
 Steve Gregory –  tenor clarinet and flute

Technical
 Engineer: Michael Glossop
 Recorded at Farmyard on the Manor Mobile
 Artwork, photography, design – Ray Smith

References

1975 albums
Kevin Coyne albums
Virgin Records albums